Donata Burgatta (born 26 September 1973) is an Italian judoka. She competed in the women's heavyweight event at the 1996 Summer Olympics.

References

1973 births
Living people
Italian female judoka
Olympic judoka of Italy
Judoka at the 1996 Summer Olympics
Sportspeople from Milan
Mediterranean Games bronze medalists for Italy
Mediterranean Games medalists in judo
Competitors at the 1997 Mediterranean Games
20th-century Italian women
21st-century Italian women